Upsilon Serpentis, Latinized from υ Serpentis, is a star in the Serpens Caput section of the constellation Serpens.  Based upon an annual parallax shift of 13.04 mas as seen from Earth, it is located around 250 light years from the Sun. The star is bright enough to be faintly visible to the naked eye, having an apparent visual magnitude of +5.70. It is a member of the Hyades group, a stream of stars that share a similar trajectory to the Hyades cluster.

This is an A-type main sequence star with a stellar classification of A3 V. It has an estimated 2.9 times the mass of the Sun and around 2.2 times the Sun's radius. With an age of 403 million years, it has a high rate of spin with a projected rotational velocity of 133 km/s. It is radiating 23 times the solar luminosity from its photosphere at an effective temperature of 8,917 K.

Upsilon Serpentis is a suspected astrometric binary, which means an undetected companion is perturbing the motion of the visible star. This may be coming from the companion, since A-type stars are not expected to emit X-rays.

References

A-type main-sequence stars
Astrometric binaries
Hyades Stream
Serpens (constellation)
Serpentis, Upsilon
Durchmusterung objects
Serpentis, 31
141187
077336
5870